Earth Defense Force 5 is the fifth main installment, and the eighth game in the Earth Defense Force video game series. Developed by  Sandlot and published by D3 Publisher, the game was released for the PlayStation 4 in Japan on December 7, 2017. The game was released simultaneously in the United States, Europe, China, and South Korea on December 11, 2018, as a digital exclusive for the PlayStation 4. Earth Defense Force 5 departs from the continuity established by Earth Defense Force 2017 and Earth Defense Force 2025/4.1, and is set in a new continuity where the Earth Defense Force is a private military corporation and sees action for the first time in the year 2022.

Gameplay

Earth Defense Force 5 follows the same gameplay style as the previous 4.1. At the start of the game, the player cannot select the difficulties Hardest or Inferno, however this becomes unlocked after beating the game once. Unlike 4.1 however, some missions now contain pre-placed vehicles, normally being civilian vehicles that the player can occupy.

The single player campaign features 110 missions, the highest number of any EDF game to date (not counting DLC). Some missions now contain story elements to follow, such as Mission 1, where the player receives training of the game's controls from an EDF Ranger. Other levels require the player to follow a certain squad of soldiers in order to progress through the mission.

Downloadable content
Earth Defense Force 5 has an available season pass in Japan, which guarantees players access to all downloadable content as it is released. D3 Publisher confirmed that DLC would include both mission packs and aesthetic modifications such as skins for weapons and armor.

The first mission pack, Additional Mission Pack 1: Extra Challenge, was released in Japan on April 11, 2019, and costs 1,200 yen on the PlayStation Store. It consists of more than 10 new missions designed to be especially challenging, featuring extremely powerful and rare enemy types from the campaign as common enemies and introducing new enemy types such as armored variants of the Colonists. It also introduces more than 30 new weapons among the four classes that can be unlocked by picking up weapon items.

The second mission pack, Additional Mission Pack 2: Super Challenge, was released in Japan on May 17, 2019.

Reception

Earth Defense Force 5 has an aggregate score of 72/100 on Metacritic based on 44 reviews. IGN called the game a fun "energetic essay on action game design" despite the dated graphics and gave it a rating of 8.3/10. GameSpot also criticized the dated character models and textures but still gave the game a rating of 8 out of 10 citing the storytelling, variety of weapons and characters which leads to replayability and the co-op gameplay. Game Informer rated the game 7 out of 10.

Sales 
By August 2022, total worldwide shipments and digital sales had surpassed one million units.

Notes

References

External links
  

2017 video games
Alien invasions in video games
Cooperative video games
D3 Publisher games
Earth Defense Force
Multiplayer and single-player video games
PlayStation 4 games
Sandlot games
Third-person shooters
Video game sequels
Video games set in 2022
Video games developed in Japan
Video games scored by Masafumi Takada
Video games using Havok
Windows games